Enzo Bartolini (15 February 1914 – 3 July 1998) was an Italian rower who competed in the 1936 Summer Olympics. He was born in Livorno. In 1936 he won the silver medal as crew member of the Italian boat in the men's eight event.

References

External links
 
 
 
 

1914 births
1998 deaths
Italian male rowers
Olympic rowers of Italy
Rowers at the 1936 Summer Olympics
Olympic silver medalists for Italy
Sportspeople from Livorno
Olympic medalists in rowing
Medalists at the 1936 Summer Olympics
European Rowing Championships medalists
20th-century Italian people